Frozen Man Creek may refer to:

 Frozen Man Creek (Plum Creek), a creek in South Dakota
 Frozen Man Creek (Sulphur Creek), a creek in South Dakota